WDWN (89.1 FM) is a radio station broadcasting an Alternative format. Licensed to Auburn, New York, United States, the station serves the Finger Lakes area.  The station is owned by Cayuga County Community College. The station is also broadcast on HD radio.

References

External links

DWN
Radio stations established in 1975